The 2005 Manly-Warringah Sea Eagles season was the 59th in the club's history. Coached by Des Hasler and captained by Michael Monaghan, they competed in the National Rugby League's 2005 Telstra Premiership, finishing 8th (out of 15), just reaching the finals series. The Sea Eagles were then knocked out in their first play-off match by minor premiers, the Parramatta Eels.

Manly-Warringah made an unexpected bright start to the 2005 season, at one stage leading the competition outright after round seven. However their season was marred early by the dismissal of John Hopoate who was given a 17-match ban for striking Cronulla-Sutherland Sharks forward Keith Galloway in the round two match. Steve Matai made his first grade debut in that match, a late replacement after John Hopoate was suspended, then sacked by the club. Furthermore, the season overall was dominated by the team's fear of playing matches at night, with most of their defeats occurring under lights. This was pointed out by the Channel Nine commentators prior to its round eight, Friday night match against the Brisbane Broncos at Suncorp Stadium (which was in fact Manly's first Friday night match in six years) which the Sea Eagles indeed lost by a scoreline of 38–12.

Controversial physiologist, Steve Dank was working with the Sea Eagles this season. Manly's Ben Kennedy, Steve Menzies and Anthony Watmough were selected to play in the 2005 State of Origin series for New South Wales.

This season also marked the beginning of the Sea Eagles' rivalry with the Melbourne Storm. In round three, both teams had won their opening two matches leading into an early-season top-of-the-table match which Manly won 25–18. Although Manly's time at the top of the ladder was short-lived, it proved that Manly could compete with the best sides in the competition.

The Sea Eagles suffered a late-season form slump with injuries plaguing the club, however wins over the Broncos in round 22 and the Raiders in the final round ensured their first finals appearance since 1998. They were knocked out in the first round of the playoffs following 46–22 loss to the minor premiers Parramatta.

The club's leading try scorer was Brett Stewart with 16. Their leading point scorer was Michael Witt with 140.

Ladder

References

Manly Warringah Sea Eagles seasons
Manly-Warringah Sea Eagles season